Spalacopsis similis is a species of beetle in the family Cerambycidae. It was described by Gahan in 1892.

References

Spalacopsis
Beetles described in 1892